In Marxist practice, a maximum programme consists of a series of demands aiming to achieve socialism.

The concept of a maximum programme comes from the 1891 Erfurt Programme of the German SPD, later mirrored by much of the Socialist International of 1889–1916.  The maximalist line is contrasted with a minimum programme of immediate social demands.  In the short term, Marxist parties were to pursue only the minimum programme of achievable demands, which would improve the lives of workers until the inevitable collapse of capitalism.  "Minimalist" groups believed that the achievement of a minimum programme would enable them to become mass parties and pursue the maximum programme.

The Communist International (Comintern) of 1919–1943 initially developed the alternative idea of  transitional slogans, seeing the minimum/maximum division as leaving social democratic parties always campaigning only for their minimum programme and not clearly planning a route to achieve their maximum programme, though the eventual programme of the 1928 6th World Congress of the Comintern was more in line with a maximum programme than with transitional slogans.

External links
The Erfurt Program
The Erfurt Programme Explained In Its Basic Part
The Social Revolution
Programme of the Communist International

Marxist theory